Daugavpils Municipality was a municipality in Latgale, Latvia from 2009 to 2021.

It was formed in 2009 by merging Ambeļi parish, Biķernieki parish, Demene parish, Dubna parish, Kalkūne parish, Kalupe parish, Laucesa parish, Līksna parish, Maļinova parish, Medumi parish, Naujene parish, Nīcgale parish, Saliena parish, Skrudaliena parish, Svente parish, Tabore parish, Vabole parish, Vecsaliena parish and Višķi parish, with the administration located in Daugavpils city, which was not included within the municipality.

After the 2021 reform it merged with Ilūkste Municipality to form the Augšdaugava Municipality within the borders of the former Daugavpils District.

As of 2020, the population was 19,639.

Demographics

Ethnic composition 

As of 1 January 2010 the ethnic composition of the municipality is as follows:

Twin towns — sister cities

Daugavpils Municipality is twinned with:

 Bad Doberan, Germany
 Braslaw, Belarus
 Edineț, Moldova
 Hlybokaye, Belarus
 Ichnia, Ukraine
 Łomża, Poland
 Rokiškis, Lithuania
 Sharkawshchyna, Belarus
 Vitebsk, Belarus
 Zarasai, Lithuania
 Zaraysky District, Russia

Gallery

See also
 Administrative divisions of Latvia

References

 
Former municipalities of Latvia